The Zürich Tram Museum (German: Tram-Museum Zürich; TMZ) is a transport museum in the Swiss city of Zürich, specialising in the history of the Zürich tram system. The main museum site is located at the former tram depot, Tramdepot Burgwies. The museum also maintains a workshop at the much smaller former tram depot of Wartau.

The tram museum is run by an association, the Verein Tram Museum Zürich, which has some 500 members, and is responsible for looking after the exhibits of the museum. The tram cars remain in the ownership of the Verkehrsbetriebe Zürich, the city-owned operator of the Zürich tram system.

History 

The Zürich Tram Museum was founded in 1967, and at first it used various borrowed locations to store and work on its exhibits. In 1989 it took over the tiny former  (StZH) tram depot at Wartau, which had been out of use as a tram depot since the 1923 acquisition of the StZH by the city, and opened its first public museum there. The new museum was just big enough to hold five preserved trams.

In May 2007, the museum moved to the significantly larger former tram depot at Burgwies, although Wartau has been retained as a workshop and store. On 26 May 2007, twelve heritage trams each ran from  a different Zürich terminus, converging into a parade along the Limmatquai. At the end of the parade, they ran to the new museum at Burgwies.

On 21 May 2017, to celebrate both the fiftieth anniversary of the foundation of the tram museum, and the tenth anniversary of its move to Burgweis, another tram parade was held through the city centre. The parade comprised 18 tram cars from all epochs between 1885 and 2006 and was led by a horse-drawn replica of a Zürich horse tram that is normally kept at the Swiss Museum of Transport in Lucerne. Other trams came from the Zürich Tram Museum's preserved fleet, and from Verkehrsbetriebe Zürich's current operational fleet. The tram crews and passengers wore costumes appropriate to the era of the tram in which they travelled.

Access 

The main museum site at Burgwies is open to the public on several days a week, with exact opening hours varying by day of the week and season of the year. The museum is located by the Bergweis tram stop, on tram route 11 at the boundary of the city's Weinegg and Hirslanden quarters. The museum also runs an occasional historic tram service between Burgwies and the city centre, billed as tram route 21. Route 21 operates on both days of the last weekend of each month, providing a half-hourly frequency in summer and an hourly frequency in winter, during museum opening hours.

The site at Wartau is located on tram route 13 in the Höngg quarter, but is not normally open to the public.

Collection

Tram fleet 
The museum's collection includes about 20 preserved tram cars, the majority of which are operational. In addition to cars from Zürich's city owned fleet, the collection includes cars from the private companies that operated routes around Zürich in the early days. Cars from the city fleet demonstrate changes in design over time, from cars very similar to these early private sector vehicles, through the 1930s Elefant bogie cars and 1940s  cars, to trams recently retired.

The preserved tram fleet of the museum includes the following vehicles:

Other exhibits 

The museum also includes a mezzanine level with smaller exhibits. These include a model tramway layout illustrating the city's street scene over the years, together with a selection of documents and photographs. The museum shop stocks a selection of books, postcards, models and souvenirs.

The museum building, the former Tramdepot Burgwies, is also a significant exhibit in its own right, and is shared with a branch of the Migros supermarket chain. The building is inscribed on the Swiss Inventory of Cultural Property of National Significance.

References

External links 

Zurich Tram Museum official web site

Cultural property of national significance in the canton of Zürich
Museums in Zürich
Transport museums in Switzerland